The Taekwondo competition at the 2012 Games will include 128 athletes, 64 in each gender, 16 in each of the eight weight divisions. Each competing nation will be allowed to enter a maximum of 4 competitors, two of each gender. Each nation will therefore be eligible to compete in a maximum of half the weight categories.

4 places are reserved for Great Britain as Host Country, and a further four shall invitational as decided by the Tripartite Commission. The remaining 120 places shall be allocated through a qualification process, in which athletes win quota places for their respective nation.

Timeline

Qualification summary

Men's events

−58 kg

−68 kg

−80 kg

+80 kg

Women's events

−49 kg

−57 kg

−67 kg

+67 kg

References

 
Qualification for the 2012 Summer Olympics
Olympic Qualification
Olympic Qualification
2012